Rhinophis punctatus, or Müller's earth snake, is a species of snake in the Uropeltidae family. It is endemic to the island of Sri Lanka.

Description
Yellowish dorsally and ventrally, each scale with a blackspot. However, the scales of the rows adjoining the vertebral row lack spots.

Scalation very similar to Rhinophis oxyrhynchus. Differs in having a more slender body (diameter 47 to 49 times in total length) and a higher number of ventrals (236-246).

References

Further reading
 Müller, J.P. 1832. Beiträge zur Anatomie und Naturgeschichte der Amphibien. Zeitschrift für Physiologie. Band 4. pp. 190–275, Plates XVIII-XXII. (Rhinophis punctata [sic], p. 248, Plate XXI, Figures 1-3).

punctatus
Snakes of Asia
Reptiles of Sri Lanka
Endemic fauna of Sri Lanka
Reptiles described in 1832
Taxa named by Johannes Peter Müller